Sideroxylon cartilagineum is a species of plant in the family Sapotaceae. It is endemic to Mexico.

References

cartilagineum
Endemic flora of Mexico
Trees of Guerrero
Trees of Jalisco
Trees of Sinaloa
Near threatened plants
Taxonomy articles created by Polbot
Taxa named by Arthur Cronquist